North Quincy, Illinois is a census-designated place and neighborhood located within and immediately north of the outskirts of its parent city of Quincy. Parts of North Quincy also extend into the Riverside and Ellington townships of Adams County as a result of urban sprawl. Collectively, North Quincy functions as Quincy's largest suburb, separated from its parent city by Locust Street, a rail line, and woodlands that follow Cedar Creek–the borders are approximate. With few exceptions, much of the layout of the community does not follow the traditional grid street pattern of its parent city.

Points of interest
 Bob Mays Park & Bill Klingner Trail
 Illinois Veterans Home
 All Wars Museum
 Spring Lake Country Club
 Quincy Station (Amtrak)

Businesses based in North Quincy
 Broadcast Electronics
 Hollister-Whitney
 Midwest Patterns
 Titan Tire Corporation

See also
Quincy micropolitan area

References

External links

Unincorporated communities in Adams County, Illinois
Quincy, Illinois micropolitan area
Quincy–Hannibal area
Census-designated places in Illinois
Populated places established in 1871
1871 establishments in Illinois